Zhilin or Zhylin is a Russian masculine surname, its feminine counterpart is Zhilina. It may refer to:

 Aleksey Zhilin (c. 1766–1848), Russian composer
 Ilia Zhilin (born 1985), Russian volleyball player
 Heorhiy Zhylin (1925–1997), Soviet and Ukrainian rower 
 Nikolai Zhilin (born 1992), Russian ice hockey player
 Vasily Zhilin (1915–1947), Soviet and Russian soldier
 Viktor Zhylin (1923–2009), Soviet and Ukrainian football player and manager

Russian-language surnames